Richard Elliot (born January 16, 1960) is a Scottish-born American saxophonist. He was nominated for a Grammy Award for Best Pop Instrumental Album at the 56th Annual Grammy Awards for Summer Horns.

Career
Elliot started out as a member of the jazz-rock unit, KittyHawk, playing lyricon (a wind synthesizer) and saxophone, and recording several albums with them. He then became a member of the funk band Tower of Power, playing tenor sax for five years during the 1980s. That was followed by a stint at a member of the Yellowjackets. He also worked on Stacy Lattisaw's 1986 album Take Me All the Way. His solo career took off when he remade the Percy Sledge classic "When a Man Loves a Woman", which had also been remade by Michael Bolton. Other well-known songs include "In the Groove", "Take Your Time", "Crush", "Chill Factor", "Corner Pocket" and "Sly", as well as remakes of classic pop songs such as "I'm Not in Love" and the Luther Vandross hits "Here and Now" and "Your Secret Love".

Elliot participated with fellow saxophonists Paul Taylor and Gerald Albright, as well as keyboardist Jeff Lorber, in the "Grooving for Grover" concert series. The series honored the legacy of the late Grover Washington Jr.

Elliot was known for his zebra-striped tenor saxophone. In 2011, he switched from LA SAX Saxes to Dakota Saxophones, which the owner, Peter LaPlaca, sold for Dakota.

In 2005, Elliot joined trumpeter Rick Braun to co-found their own label, ARTizen Music Group (now known as Artistry Music). Among the first albums on that label is Elliot's own Metro Blue.

Elliot played the lyricon on several songs on the album Mirage a Trois (1983) by the Yellowjackets.

Discography
 Initial Approach (ITI, 1984)
 Trolltown (Intima, 1986)
 The Power of Suggestion (Intima, 1988)
 Take to the Skies (Intima, 1989)
 What's Inside (Enigma, 1990)
 On the Town (Manhattan, 1991)
 Soul Embrace (Capitol/Manhattan, 1993)
 After Dark (Blue Note, 1994)
 City Speak (Blue Note, 1996)
 Jumpin' Off (Metro Blue, 1997)
 Chill Factor (Capitol/Blue Note, 1999)
 Crush (Verve/GRP, 2001)
 Ricochet (GRP, 2003)
 Metro Blue (Artizen, 2005)
 R n R (featuring Rick Braun) (Artizen, 2007)
 Rock Steady (Artistry Music, 2009)
 In the Zone (Artistry Music, 2011)
 Lip Service (Heads Up, 2014)
 Summer Madness (Hear Music, 2016)
 Authentic Life (Shanachie, 2021)

Awards and nominations 

!
|-
|align=center|2013
|Summer Horns
|Grammy Award for Best Pop Instrumental Album
|
|
|-

References

External links
Official Website

1960 births
Living people
Tower of Power members
Smooth jazz saxophonists
21st-century saxophonists
British male saxophonists
Scottish jazz saxophonists
21st-century British male musicians
Mack Avenue Records artists
British male jazz musicians